Mutisieae is a tribe of the family Asteraceae, subfamily Mutisioideae.

Genera
Mutisieae genera recognized by the Global Compositae Database as of June 2022:

Adenocaulon 
Amblysperma 
Brachyclados 
Chaetanthera 
Chaptalia 
Chucoa 
Cyclolepis 
Eriachaenium 
Gerbera 
Leibnitzia 
Lulia 
Moscharia 
Mutisia 
Pachylaena 
Panphalea 
Perdicium 
Trichocline 
Uechtritzia

References

 
Asteraceae tribes